Karl Moore (born 19 November 1988) is an Irish former footballer who played as a winger.

Career
Born in Dublin, Karl began his career at his local side St Kevins Boys. At the age of 16 he joined Manchester City. At Manchester City he lived with Micah Richards.

Moore was part of the Manchester City youth side beaten 3–2 by Liverpool in the final of the FA Youth Cup in 2006. On 29 August 2008 he went out on loan from Manchester City to Millwall until January 2009 and made his début for the London club the very next day in Millwall's 2–1 home win against Huddersfield Town. He went on to make a total of nine appearances for the Lions during his loan spell there.

On 8 June 2010, Karl was released along with Martin Petrov, Sylvinho, Jack Redshaw and Benjani.
In August that year, Moore returned home to join University College Dublin AFC in a bid to regain fitness and match sharpness as he stepped up his return from injury. Karl made his League of Ireland debut for UCD AFC in a game against Sligo Rovers as a late substitute and soon became a regular with the students. Karl left UCD AFC at the end of the 2010 season, despite being asked to stay on.

In February 2011 Karl signed a one-year deal with Connacht outfit Galway United, although there was also interest from several other League of Ireland clubs.

It was rumoured, on 12 June 2011, that Moore may make a return to British football, with SPL club Motherwell understood to be leading the chase for his signature.

However, on 3 August, it was announced that Karl had signed for Airtricity League Champions, Shamrock Rovers, after leaving Galway United due to financial troubles at the club Hoops sign Karl Moore.

Karl joined Rovers' fierce rivals Bohemians on 13 January 2012, and scored on his competitive debut against Portadown FC in the Setanta Cup. His first league goals for the club came on 29 June when he netted a brace in a 4–0 thumping of Shamrock Rovers at Dalymount Park. Despite interest from other clubs, Moore signed a new one-year contract with Bohs at the end of the 2012 season.

Later life
Moore studied for A-Levels in maths, accountancy and economics while living in Manchester. He later studied accountancy at Manchester University, finished his studies in Dublin, and as of October 2021 was working as a commercial finance analyst.

References

External links

1988 births
Living people
Association football wingers
Manchester City F.C. players
Millwall F.C. players
Association footballers from Dublin (city)
Republic of Ireland association footballers
Republic of Ireland youth international footballers
Republic of Ireland under-21 international footballers
Expatriate footballers in England
University College Dublin A.F.C. players
Galway United F.C. (1937–2011) players
Shamrock Rovers F.C. players
Bohemian F.C. players
Bray Wanderers F.C. players
Shelbourne F.C. players
English Football League players
League of Ireland players
Republic of Ireland expatriate association footballers